Philip Palmer Green is a theoretical and computational biologist noted for developing important algorithms and procedures used in Gene mapping and DNA sequencing. He earned his doctorate from Berkeley in mathematics in 1976 with a dissertation on C*-algebra under the direction of Marc Rieffel, but transitioned from pure mathematics into applied work in biology and bioinformatics. Green has obtained numerous important results, including in developing Phred, a widely used DNA trace analyzer, in mapping techniques, and in genetic analysis. Green was elected to the National Academy of Sciences in 2001 and won the Gairdner Award in 2002.

See also
Phred base calling

References

External links

Living people
21st-century American biologists
Members of the United States National Academy of Sciences
University of California, Berkeley alumni
American bioinformaticians
Year of birth missing (living people)